Fabián Ríos (born July 5, 1980) is a Colombian actor and model. He is best known for his appearance in Sin senos no hay paraíso (2008) and Sin senos sí hay paraíso (2016-2019). He also starred in Tierra de reyes (2015).

Early life
Ríos was born in Curití, Santander, Colombia. From a very young age he left his village in pursuit of his dream. Upon arriving in Bucaramanga he began his acting studies and quickly fell into modeling, then various contract's that enabled him to support himself and family.

Career
Ríos gradually became involved in the field of television and took part in several programs from the city's regional channel.

Some time later he moved to Bogotá to attend the country's most prestigious acting schools and begin to join the jet set.

He acted in a young love story called Siete Veces Amada in 2002, and thanks to this interpretation was nominated Best Young Actor Premios TV y Novelas - Colombia. The following year he played the villain in The Authentic Rodrigo Leal.

In 2005, Rios starred in Padres e Hijos as 'Antonio Vaquero'.

For RCN, in 2007 he once again played the villain in the Colombian version of Floricienta, then joined the cast of Zona Rosa.

In 2008, he joined the cast of Sin Senos no hay Paraíso for Telemundo with Carmen Villalobos and Catherine Siachoque, playing Albeiro. The third-season premieres in June on Telemundo

In 2009, he was hired by RCN to star in Doña Bella with Zharick León, Marcelo Buquet and Stephanie Cayo.

In 2010, he signed an exclusivity contract with Telemundo to be the main antagonist of the U.S. telenovela El Fantasma de Elena with Elizabeth Gutiérrez, Segundo Cernadas, and Ana Layevska

In 2011, he acted in Los Herederos Del Monte with Marlene Favela and Mario Cimarro, and in Mi Corazón Insiste with Jencarlos Canela and Carmen Villalobos. He was also part of the jury panel in the Miss Universe Puerto Rico 2012 on Telemundo Puerto Rico.

In 2012, he acted in Corazón Valiente in the role of Willy del Castillo, with Ximena Duque, Aylín Mújica, Adriana Fonseca and José Luis Reséndez. This role gained him 2 awards at the Premios Tu Mundo 2012: Best Couple and Best Kiss with actress Ximena Duque.

In 2013, he play again a villain role in Dama y Obrero, with his El Fantasma de Elena and Mi Corazón Insiste co-star Ana Layevska, and his Los Herederos Del Monte and Corazón Valiente co-star José Luis Reséndez.

In 2014, he appear in the second season of the show Top Chef Estrellas.

In 2014, he play again a villain role in Tierra de reyes with his Corazón Valiente special participation co-star Sonya Smith.

Filmography

References

External links

1980 births
Living people
Colombian male telenovela actors
Colombian male models